Calochortus tolmiei is a North American species of flowering plant in the lily family known by the common names Tolmie's star-tulip and pussy ears. It was discovered by and named for Dr. William Fraser Tolmie.

It is native to the west coast of the United States: Washington, Oregon, and northern California as far south as Santa Cruz County, though it is now apparently extinct in Washington. It is a common member of the flora in several types of habitat.

Description
Calochortus tolmiei is a perennial herb producing a slender stem, branched or unbranched, to 40 centimeters in maximum height. There is a basal leaf up to 40 centimeters long which does not wither at flowering, and generally a smaller leaf farther up the stem.

The inflorescence is a solitary bloom or a cluster of bell-shaped flowers. Each has white to pale pink or purple petals, each up to 2.5 centimeters long, and three narrower sepals beneath. The petals are usually very hairy on their inner surfaces, and may be fringed with long hairs as well.

The fruit is a winged capsule 2 or 3 centimeters long containing several dark brown seeds.

References

External links
Jepson Manual Treatment: Calochortus tolmiei
United States Department of Agriculture Plants Profile: Calochortus tolmiei
Calochortus tolmiei — Calphotos Photo gallery, University of California @ Berkeley

tolmiei
Flora of the Klamath Mountains
Natural history of the California chaparral and woodlands
Natural history of the California Coast Ranges
Natural history of the San Francisco Bay Area
Plants described in 1840
Flora of the West Coast of the United States
Flora without expected TNC conservation status